Exodus Records was a semi-independent record label started in 1966. It was dependent on Vee-Jay Records for both masters and sleeves.

References

See also
 List of record labels

Defunct record labels of the United States
Jazz record labels
Record labels established in 1966